Vollert is a German surname. It may refer to:
 Jannes Vollert, German professional footballer
 Andrew Vollert, American football tight end
 Vollert Anlagenbau GmbH, a manufacturer of VLEX, a road-rail shunting robot
 Verlag Jochen Vollert, German publisher